In mathematics, two objects, especially systems of axioms or semantics for them, are called cryptomorphic if they are equivalent but not obviously equivalent.  In particular, two definitions or axiomatizations of the same object are "cryptomorphic" if it is not obvious that they define the same object.  Examples of cryptomorphic definitions abound in matroid theory and others can be found elsewhere, e.g., in group theory the definition of a group by a single operation of division, which is not obviously equivalent to the usual three "operations" of identity element, inverse, and multiplication.

This word is a play on the many morphisms in mathematics, but "cryptomorphism" is only very distantly related to "isomorphism", "homomorphism", or "morphisms". The equivalence may in a cryptomorphism, if it is not actual identity, be informal, or may be formalized in terms of a bijection or equivalence of categories between the mathematical objects defined by the two cryptomorphic axiom systems.

Etymology

The word was coined by Garrett Birkhoff before 1967, for use in the third edition of his book Lattice Theory.  Birkhoff did not give it a formal definition, though others working in the field have made some attempts since.

Use in matroid theory

Its informal sense was popularized (and greatly expanded in scope) by Gian-Carlo Rota in the context of matroid theory: there are dozens of equivalent axiomatic approaches to matroids, but two different systems of axioms often look very different.  

In his 1997 book Indiscrete Thoughts, Rota describes the situation as follows:

Though there are many cryptomorphic concepts in mathematics outside of matroid theory and universal algebra, the word has not caught on among mathematicians generally.  It is, however, in fairly wide use among researchers in matroid theory.

See also
Combinatorial class, an equivalence among combinatorial enumeration problems hinting at the existence of a cryptomorphism

References

 Birkhoff, G.:  Lattice Theory,  3rd edition. American Mathematical Society Colloquium Publications, Vol. XXV. 1967.
 Crapo, H. and Rota, G.-C.: On the foundations of combinatorial theory: Combinatorial geometries.  M.I.T. Press, Cambridge, Mass. 1970.
 Elkins, James: Chapter Cryptomorphs in Why Are Our Pictures Puzzles?: On the Modern Origins of Pictorial Complexity, 1999
 Rota, G.-C.:  Indiscrete Thoughts, Birkhäuser Boston, Inc., Boston, MA. 1997.
 White, N., editor:  Theory of Matroids, Encyclopedia of Mathematics and its Applications, 26.  Cambridge University Press, Cambridge. 1986.

Mathematical terminology
Matroid theory